Limonium braunii is a species of flowering plants of the family Plumbaginaceae. The species is endemic to Cape Verde. It is listed as an endangered plant by the IUCN. The species was first described by the German Carl August Bolle as Statice braunii and was placed in the genus Limonium by the French Auguste Chevalier in 1935. Its local name is carqueja, a name that may also refer to the related species Limonium brunneri and Limonium jovibarba.

Distribution and ecology
Limonium braunii is mainly found in northern rocky and stony shores of the islands of Santo Antão, São Nicolau, Fogo and Brava.

Other
Limonium braunii was depicted on a 20 Cape Verdean escudo coin issued in 1994.

References

Further reading
Wolfram Lobin, Teresa Leyens, Norbert Kilian, Matthias Erben, Klaus Lewejohann, The Genus Limonium (Plumbaginaceae) on the Cape Verde Islands, W Africa, Willdenowia, Berlin, vol. 25, no. 1, 20 June 1994, p. 197-214

braunii
Flora of Santo Antão, Cape Verde
Flora of São Nicolau, Cape Verde
Flora of Fogo, Cape Verde
Flora of Brava, Cape Verde
Endemic flora of Cape Verde